The Women's U23 Individual road race at the 2009 European Road Championships took place in Hooglede, Belgium on 4 July over a course of 135.3 km.

Final classification

References

External links

2009 European Road Championships
European Road Championships – Women's U23 road race
2009 in women's road cycling